Gull is a surname found in people of British origin. Spelling variations of this family name include: Gull, Gul, Guil, Guile, Guille, etc.

 Arthur Gull (1867–1951), Australian politician
 Cameron Gull (1860–1922), Liberal Unionist politician from England
 Thomas Gull (1832–1878), Australian politician
 Sir William Gull, 1st Baronet, a prominent 19th century English physician

See also
 Meirchion Gul, 5th-century king of Rheged, whose epithet means the Lean
 Gull (disambiguation)
 Gul (name)

Surnames of British Isles origin